In enzymology, a heptaprenyl diphosphate synthase is an enzyme that catalyzes the chemical reaction

(2E,6E)-farnesyl diphosphate + 4 isopentenyl diphosphate  4 diphosphate + all-trans-heptaprenyl diphosphate

Thus, the two substrates of this enzyme are (2E,6E)-farnesyl diphosphate and isopentenyl diphosphate, whereas its two products are diphosphate and all-trans-heptaprenyl diphosphate.

This enzyme belongs to the family of transferases, specifically those transferring aryl or alkyl groups other than methyl groups.  The systematic name of this enzyme class is (2E,6E)-farnesyl-diphosphate:isopentenyl-diphosphate farnesyltranstransferase (adding 4 isopentenyl units). Other names in common use include all-trans-heptaprenyl-diphosphate synthase, heptaprenyl pyrophosphate synthase,  and heptaprenyl pyrophosphate synthetase.  This enzyme participates in biosynthesis of steroids.

Structural studies

References

 

EC 2.5.1
Enzymes of known structure